Shixinggia is a genus of oviraptorosaurian dinosaur from the Late Cretaceous period of Shixing County, Guangdong, China, for which it was named. While no skull was recovered, the specimen (BVP-112) is known from a fair amount of post-cranial material that shows it was a fairly derived oviraptorosaur (slightly more advanced than Nomingia), of superfamily Caenagnathoidea. Lü et al. (2003, 2005) describe it as an oviraptorid, but it could be a caenagnathid .

See also

 Timeline of oviraptorosaur research

References
 Lu, J., Zhang, B.-K. and Li (2003). "A new oviraptorid dinosaur from the Late Cretaceous of Shixing, Nanxiong Basin of Guangdong Province, Southern China." Journal of Vertebrate Paleontology 23(3), 73A.
 Lu, J. (2004). Oviraptorid dinosaurs from southern China. Southrern Methodist University. unpublished PhD dissertation. 
 Lu, J. (2005). Oviraptorid dinosaurs from Southern China. Geological Publishing House, Beijing. . 200 pages + 8 plates.
 Lu, J. and Zhang, B.-K. (2005). "A new oviraptorid (Theropoda: Oviraptorosauria) from the Upper Cretaceous of the Nanxiong Basin, Guangdong Province of southern China." Acta Palaeontologica Sinica 44(3): 412–422.

External links
 Luis Rey and the new oviraptorosaur panoply at Tetrapod Zoology

Late Cretaceous dinosaurs of Asia
Oviraptorids
Fossil taxa described in 2005